Scott Dill (born April 5, 1966) is a former NFL offensive tackle who played 10 seasons in the NFL.

Scott Dill was an accomplished football player. He retired because of a back injury. Dill played for the Phoenix Cardinals, the Tampa Bay Buccaneers, and the Minnesota Vikings.

1966 births
Living people
American football offensive tackles
Memphis Tigers football players
Phoenix Cardinals players
Tampa Bay Buccaneers players
Minnesota Vikings players